Turkey Creek, a tributary of the Nueces River with its source in Kinney County, Texas .  It passes through Uvalde and Dimmit Counties to its mouth at Espantosa Lake in Espantosa Slough south of Crystal City in Zavala County, Texas.

History
Turkey Creek, near Cline, Texas in western Uvalde County,  was a watering stop and crossing place on the San Antonio-El Paso Road 9.04 miles west of crossing on the Nueces River and 15.23 miles from its crossing of Elm Creek.  From 1871 to the 1881 the Turkey Creek Stage Stop was located near the crossing, run by Celeste Pingenot, who also had a store and saloon there, This became the town of Turkey Creek, then Wallace before being changed to Cline shortly after the Texas and New Orleans Railroad arrived there.

References

Tributaries of the Nueces River
Rivers of Kinney County, Texas
Rivers of Uvalde County, Texas
Bodies of water of Dimmit County, Texas
Rivers of Zavala County, Texas
San Antonio–El Paso Road